, released as We Hope For Blooming in Southeast Asia, is a Japanese shōjo manga series by Anashin. It was  serialized in the monthly manga magazine Dessert from April 2014 to September 2019, with the chapters collected in 14 tankōbon volumes. During the series' run, a drama CD was released on June 24, 2017. A live-action film adaptation was released on December 14, 2018.

Plot
Mitsuki is a shy first-year student at Seiryo High School struggling to make friends. To her dread, one day, four popular boys from the basketball team, heralded as the school's "four heavenly kings", drop by the café she works at. Initially reluctant, Mitsuki soon develops an unlikely friendship with them, particularly with Towa, even though Seiryo High School's basketball team is banned from dating. Just when Mitsuki finds herself growing fond of Towa, her childhood friend, Aya, returns.

Characters

 (drama CD); portrayed by Tao Tsuchiya (film)
Mitsuki is a first-year student in class 4 at Seiryo High School. Though shy, she is determined to make new friends.

 (drama CD); portrayed by Takumi Kitamura (film)
Towa is Mitsuki's classmate and a member of Seiryo High School's basketball team. He is indifferent to the attention he receives from girls, but he finds Mitsuki easy to get along with. Over time, he gradually falls in love with Mitsuki.

 (drama CD); portrayed by Yu Inaba (film)
Rui is a first-year student in class 7 and a member of Seiryo High School's basketball team. He is mischievous and loves to pull pranks on Mitsuki. He sees Towa as a rival.

 (drama CD); portrayed by Hayato Isomura (film)
Kyosuke is a second-year student in class 4 and a member of Seiryo High School's basketball team. He gets along with girls very well and earns top scores in his grade.

 (drama CD); portrayed by Yosuke Sugino (film)
Ryuji is a second-year student in class 4 and a member of Seiryo High School's basketball team. He is in love with Nanase, but he has trouble telling her his feelings.

 (drama CD); portrayed by Yuta Koseki (film)
Aya is a second-year student and the star player of Hōjō High School's basketball team. He is also Mitsuki's childhood friend in elementary school who moved away upon entering middle school. Mitsuki finds him a source of inspiration and had assumed him to be a girl because of his long hair until they reunite when they are older. Aya has been in love with Mitsuki for years and views Towa as competition.

 (drama CD); portrayed by Yuki Saso (film)
Reina is Mitsuki's classmate and friend. She supports the basketball team's no-dating rule because she is a fujoshi and enjoys watching the boys interact with each other. She often takes pictures of the boys, especially during games.

 (drama CD)
Maki is a first year in class 1 who is also on the girls' basketball team. She and Mitsuki become fast friends, but she secretly has feelings for Towa.

 (drama CD); portrayed by Rika Izumi (film)
Nanase is the owner's daughter of the café Mitsuki works at and is nicknamed as "Nana" for short. Ryuji is in love with her.

Rino is the manager of Hōjō High School's basketball team and is in love with Aya.

Media

Manga

Waiting for Spring is written and illustrated by Anashin. It was serialized in the monthly shōjo manga magazine Dessert from April 24, 2014 to September 24, 2019. The chapters were collected in bound volumes by Kodansha for a total of 14 volumes, released between July 11, 2014 and May 13, 2020. During the series' run, drama CDs were released in limited edition bundles of volumes 7 and 9.

M&C! announced that Waiting for Spring had been licensed in English for Southeast Asian distribution on September 24, 2016 under the manga's original English subtitle We Hope For Blooming. Kodansha USA announced that Waiting for Spring had been licensed in English for North American distribution on October 6, 2016, with the first volume releasing in summer 2017.

Film

A live-action film adaptation was announced in March 2018 and released in theaters on December 14, 2018. The film is directed by Yuichiro Hirakawa and written by Satoko Okazaki, produced and distributed by Office Crescendo and Warner Bros., The film stars Tao Tsuchiya as Mitsuki, Yuta Koseki as Aya, Takumi Kitamura as Towa, Yu Inaba as Rui, Hayato Isomura as Kyōsuke, and Yosuke Sugino as Ryuji. Additional cast members include Rika Izumi as Nanase, Yuki Saso as Reina, and Tamaki Ogawa as Yuko (Aya's mother).

Reception

Rebecca Silverman from Anime News Network praised Mitsuki's character and the overall story composition.

Volume 2 debuted at #49 on Oricon and sold 15,428 copies in its first week. Volume 3 debuted at #24 on Oricon with 44,674 copies sold in its first week and fell to #46 with 21,443 copies sold in its second week, totaling 66,117 copies sold overall. Volume 4 debuted at #5 on Oricon with 47,250 copies sold in its first week and 119,395 copies sold overall. Volume 5 debuted at #9 on Oricon with 80,699 copies sold in its first week and 135,329 copies sold overall. Volume 6 debuted at #9 on Oricon with 95,329 copies sold in its first week and 203,581 copies sold, making it the 98th best-selling manga in Japan for the first half of 2017. Volume 7 debuted at #8 on Oricon with 52,563 copies sold in its first week and 140,115 copies sold overall. Volume 8 debuted at #6 on Oricon with 60,037 copies sold in its first week and 140,396 copies sold overall. Volume 9 debuted at #4 on Oricon with 52,563 copies sold in its first week and 139,640 copies sold overall. Volume 10 debuted at #11 on Oricon with 68,150 copies sold in its first week and 144,725 copies sold overall.

Waiting for Spring was nominated for the 41st Annual Kodansha Manga Awards under the Best Shojo Manga category. The first two volumes were included in the 2018 list of Great Graphic Novels for Teens produced by American Library Association's Young Adult Library Services Association.

References

External links
Official website 
Official website

Basketball in anime and manga
Kodansha manga
Live-action films based on manga
Romance anime and manga
Shōjo manga
Japanese romance films